The Seven from Texas (also known as Seven Guns from Texas and Hour of Death) is a 1964 Spanish-Italian western film directed by Joaquín Luis Romero Marchent. It was shown as part of a retrospective on Spaghetti Western at the 64th Venice International Film Festival.

Cast

References

External links

1964 films
Italian Western (genre) films
Spaghetti Western films
Spanish Western (genre) films
1964 Western (genre) films
Texas in fiction
Films directed by Joaquín Luis Romero Marchent
Films shot in Almería
1960s Italian films
1960s Spanish-language films